Eduard Gottlob Zeller (22 January 1814, Kleinbottwar19 March 1908, Stuttgart) was a German philosopher and Protestant theologian of the Tübingen School of theology. He was well known for his writings on Ancient Greek philosophy, especially Pre-Socratic Philosophy, and most of all for his celebrated, multi-volume historical treatise The Philosophy of Greeks in their Historical Development (1844–52). Zeller was also a central figure in the revival of neo-Kantianism.

Life
Eduard Zeller was born at Kleinbottwar in Württemberg, the son of a government official. He was educated first at the Evangelical Seminaries of Maulbronn and Blaubeuren starting in 1831, and later at the University of Tübingen (the Tübinger Stift), then much under the influence of Hegel. He received his doctorate in 1836 with a thesis on Plato's Laws.  In 1840 he was Privatdozent of theology at Tübingen, in 1847 professor of theology at Berne, and in 1849 professor of theology at Marburg, where he soon shifted to the philosophy faculty as the result of disputes with the Clerical party. He became professor of philosophy at the University of Heidelberg in 1862, moved to Berlin in 1872, and retired around 1895. He remained best known for his The Philosophy of Greeks in their Historical Development (1844–52). He continued to expand and improve this work to reflect new research, and the last edition appeared in 1902. It was translated into most European languages and became the standard textbook on Greek philosophy.

Zeller also published many works on theology and three volumes of philosophical essays. He was also one of the founders of the Theologische Jahrbücher (Theological Yearbooks), a periodical which became well known as the exponent of the historical method of David Strauss and Christian Baur. He wrote much on the debate about whether theology was a kind of science (Wissenschaft). Like most of his contemporaries, including Friedrich Theodor Vischer, he began with Hegelianism, but subsequently developed a system of his own. He felt the necessity of going back to Kant and critically reconsidering the epistemological problems which, he believed, Kant had only partially resolved.

Philosophical work
Nonetheless, his accomplishments in the history of philosophy were far more influential than his contributions as an original thinker. Zeller's conception of the history of Greek thought was influenced by the dialectical philosophy of Hegel. Some critics maintain that Zeller was not alive enough to cultural context and to the idiosyncrasies of individual thinkers. Some hold that he laid too much stress upon Hegel's notion of "concept", and relied too much on the Hegelian antithesis of subject and object, though his history of Greek philosophy was nonetheless influential and highly regarded. He received the highest recognition, not only from philosophers and learned societies all over the world, but also from the German emperor and German people. In 1894 the Emperor Wilhelm II made him a "Wirklicher Geheimrat" with the title of "Excellenz," and his bust, along with that of Helmholtz, was set up at the Brandenburg Gate near the statues erected to the Emperor and Empress Frederick.

The Philosophie der Griechen has been translated into English by S. F. Alleyne (2 vols, 1881) in sections: S. F. Alleyne, History of Greek Philosophy to the time of Socrates (1881) Volume 1 and Volume 2; O. J. Reichel, Socrates and the Socratic Schools (1868; 2nd ed. 1877; 3rd ed. 1885); S. F. Alleyne and A. Goodwin, Plato and the Older Academy (1876); Benjamin Francis Conn Costelloe and J. H. Muirhead, Aristotle and the Earlier Peripatetics (1897)Volume 1 and Volume 2; O. J. Reichel, Stoics, Epicureans and Sceptics (1870 and 1880); S. F. Alleyne, History of Eclecticism in Greek Philosophy (1883).

Zeller was also, in his Philosophie der Griechen, one of the first to use the word 'Superhuman' (übermensch), later central in Nietzsche and the propaganda of the Nazi Party, in adjectival form as a technical term in philosophy. He said "... thus the happiness in her can be designated superhuman (übermenschliche) while in contrast the happiness flowing from ethical virtues is merely a characteristic human good.'

Works 
The Philosophie appeared in an abbreviated form as Grundriss der Geschichte der Griechischen Philosophie (1883; 5th ed. 1898); English transl. by Alleyne and Evelyn Abbott (1886), under the title, Outlines of the History of Greek Philosophy.

Among his other works are:

Platonische Studien (1839)
Die Apostelgeschichte kritisch untersucht (1854; English translation J Dare, 1875–76: Volume 1 and Volume 2)
Entwickelung des Monotheismus bei den Griechen (1862)
Strauss und Renan (1864); (English translation 1866)
Geschichte der christlichen Kirche (1898)
Geschichte der deutschen Philosophie seit Leibniz (1873, ed. 1875)
Staat und Kirche (1873)
Strauss in seinen Leben und Schriften 1874; (English translation 1874)
Über Bedeutung und Aufgabe der Erkenntnisstheorie (1862)
Über teleologische und mechanische Naturerklärung (1876)
Vorträge und Abhandlungen (1865–84)
Religion und Philosophie bei den Römern (1866, ed. 1871)
Philosophische Aufsätze (1887).

See also
 Wilhelm Nestle

References

External links
 
 Zeller's works on Archive.org

1814 births
1908 deaths
19th-century essayists
19th-century German male writers
19th-century German philosophers
19th-century German Protestant theologians
19th-century German historians
Continental philosophers
Epistemologists
German ethicists
German Lutheran theologians
German male essayists
German male non-fiction writers
Academic staff of Heidelberg University
Historians of philosophy
Academic staff of the Humboldt University of Berlin
Lecturers
Members of the Prussian Academy of Sciences
Metaphysicians
Ontologists
People from Ludwigsburg (district)
People from the Kingdom of Württemberg
Philosophers of culture
Philosophers of education
Philosophers of mind
Philosophers of religion
Philosophers of social science
Philosophy academics
Philosophy writers
Recipients of the Pour le Mérite (civil class)
Academic staff of the University of Marburg
University of Tübingen alumni
Academic staff of the University of Tübingen
19th-century Lutherans